OneMK (formerly MK News) was a local weekly free newspaper and online news service, based in Milton Keynes.

MK News launched in August 2002 and was delivered to homes across the Milton Keynes urban area and to commuters at Milton Keynes Central railway station.

It re-branded itself to OneMK in early 2016 before its owners, Trinity Mirror, closed the publication in October 2016.

The paper was delivered on Wednesdays (competing with the Milton Keynes Citizen, which is distributed free on Thursdays). The newspaper claimed an audited adult readership of 130,000.

OneMK online
OneMK.co.uk (formerly MKWeb) was the website counterpart to OneMK, the newspaper. Articles that appeared in the paper also appeared online at onemk.co.uk, along with extra daily news reports that may not have featured in the weekly newspapers.

Ownership
OneMK was 'published and originated by a division of Local World. 

In 2012, Local World acquired MK News owner Iliffe News and Media from Yattendon Group. 

In November 2016, Local World became part of Trinity Mirror.

References

Newspapers published in Buckinghamshire
Milton Keynes